Colour by Numbers is the debut release from the alternative rock band Freeze the Atlantic.

It is the only record to feature the original Freeze the Atlantic line-up as Jon Pearce would depart the band shortly before its release.

Track listing

Personnel
Freeze the Atlantic
Jon Pearce - bass
Guy Davis - drums
Chris Knott - vocals
Andy Gilmour - guitar
Tom Stevens - guitar

References

2011 debut EPs
Freeze the Atlantic albums
Alcopop! Records EPs